Waccamaw River Warehouse Historic District is a national historic district located at Conway in Horry County, South Carolina. It includes three contributing buildings: a steamer terminal (ca. 1880), warehouse (ca. 1890), and tobacco warehouse (ca. 1900). These buildings illustrate the evolution of utilitarian structures at the end of the 19th century, documenting the shift from heavy-timber braced-frame structural members to smaller-member, balloon framing with multiple diagonal bracing and the use of a clerestory for additional light.  They are the last extant warehouses in Conway associated with the commercial trade on the Waccamaw River.

It was listed on the National Register of Historic Places in 1986.

Gallery

References

External links

Waccamaw River Warehouse Historic District Map
Waccamaw River Warehouse Historic District - Conway, South Carolina - U.S. National Register of Historic Places on Waymarking.com

Commercial buildings on the National Register of Historic Places in South Carolina
Warehouses on the National Register of Historic Places
Historic districts on the National Register of Historic Places in South Carolina
Buildings and structures in Conway, South Carolina
National Register of Historic Places in Horry County, South Carolina
Tobacco buildings in the United States